Notre-Dame-des-Érables is an unincorporated community in Gloucester County, New Brunswick, on Route 340. The community is within the local service district of the Paroisse Notre-Dame-des-Érables, which is often shortened to the same name.

History

Notable people

See also
List of communities in New Brunswick

References

Communities in Gloucester County, New Brunswick
Designated places in New Brunswick
Local service districts of Gloucester County, New Brunswick